Hughesville is the name of several places in the United States:

Hughesville, Maryland
Hughesville, Missouri
Hughesville, New Jersey
Hughesville, Pennsylvania